Santino Pellegrino (born 9 February 1965) is an Italian ice hockey player. He competed in the men's tournament at the 1992 Winter Olympics.

References

1965 births
Living people
Italian ice hockey players
Olympic ice hockey players of Italy
Ice hockey players at the 1992 Winter Olympics
Ice hockey people from Montreal
Granby Bisons players
Longueuil Chevaliers players
Asiago Hockey 1935 players